Friday Foster is an American newspaper comic strip, created and written by Jim Lawrence and illustrated by Jorge Longarón. It ran from January 18, 1970, to February 17, 1974 and was notable for featuring one of the first African-American women as the title character in a comic strip. Jackie Ormes' Torchy Brown predated it, although it saw a more limited release in the Afro-American newspaper Pittsburgh Courier.

History
Jim Lawrence had been the writer of the London Daily Express comic strip, James Bond, when he became interested in creating a comic about a black character. Spanish cartoonist Jorge Longarón was chosen as the illustrator, and the strip was syndicated by the Chicago Tribune Syndicate. The comic focused on the glamorous life of its title character, a former fashion model who became an assistant to a top fashion photographer, as described by comics historian Dave Karlen:

A 1970 issue of Jet reported on the debut of Friday Foster. The magazine stated that writer Lawrence lived in Summit, New Jersey and illustrator Langron lived in Spain. The two communicated via postal mail and telephone calls.

Artist Frank Springer did a small amount of uncredited work on the strip, recalling in the mid-2000s, "I knew the writer, who lived here in New Jersey, ... [and] I got a call a couple of times from Lawrence who said they hadn't gotten the material through from Spain" and asked Springer to fill in. "I guess over the years I did two Sunday pages, maybe three."

Dell Comics published a single issue of a Friday Foster comic book (October 1972), written by Joe Gill and illustrated by Jack Sparling.

In 1975, Friday Foster was adapted into a blaxploitation feature film of the same name, starring Pam Grier.

In September 2019, the Friday Foster character appeared in a Dick Tracy story drawn by Andrew Pepoy.

Further reading
 The Spectacular Sisterhood of Superwomen: Awesome Female Characters from Comic Book History by Hope Nicholson, Quirk Books (2017)

See also
 Friday Foster (film)

References

Foster, Friday
American comic strips
Drama comics
Adventure comics
1970 comics debuts
1974 comics endings
Comics about women
Foster, Friday
American comics adapted into films
Foster, Friday
Foster, Friday
Foster, Friday
Foster, Friday